Líneas Aéreas Suramericanas S.A.S (LAS Cargo) is a cargo airline based in Bogotá, Colombia. It operates scheduled and chartered cargo flights to Latinoamerica and the Caribbean. Its main base is El Dorado International Airport, Bogotá.

History

The airline was founded on April 14, 1972 as AeroNorte Ltda. and commenced operations using the Curtiss C-46 Commando. In 1975, it started regional cargo service and bought 2 Douglas DC-4 and 2 Douglas DC-6A.

The company changed its name in 1986 to Líneas Aéreas Suramericanas when its operation's certificate is cancelled by Law 30. Operations started serving North America with a Canadair CL-44. In 1987, it started flying between Bogotá and Panamá, when a Sud Aviation Caravelle joined the fleet.

In 1991, the first Boeing 727-100 was acquired. To complement the fleet, two McDonnell Douglas DC-9-15 freighters were added for greater national coverage. 

By 2005, the company had built its own two hangars and purchased its fourth Boeing 727-200, and by the end of 2008, two more joined the fleet. Additionally, LAS Cargo constructed two big hangars at El Dorado International Airport. They include four aircraft parking positions, structural repairs, mods, engineering services, aircraft painting facilities.

The company became an International Air Transport Association member in 2013. The company updated its corporate image in 2014, including a new logo and a new livery design for its aircraft.

Additionally, on July 13, 2016, Boeing announced the acquisition of two B737-800BCF aircraft by LAS CARGO.

Destinations

As of May 2022, LAS Cargo serves the following destinations:

LAS Cargo also operates charter flights internationally and within Colombia.

Partners
Air France
British Airways
KLM

Fleet

Current fleet

LAS Cargo has a fleet consisting of the following aircraft (at June 2022):

Former fleet
The airline previously operated the following aircraft:

5 Boeing 727-100F
1 Canadair CL-44
6 Curtiss C-46 Commando
2 Douglas C-47 Skytrain
1 Douglas C-54 Skymaster
2 Douglas DC-4
4 Douglas R6D Liftmaster
2 McDonnell Douglas DC-9-15F
7 Sud Aviation Caravelle

Accidents and incidents
On December 11, 1991, a Curtiss C-46 Commando (registration HK-2716), was flown into a hill during the approach to El Dorado International Airport. All 8 occupants were killed.

On January 31, 2001, a Sud Aviation Caravelle crashed near El Alcaraván Airport while attempting to make an emergency landing. Three of the six occupants were killed.

On December 18, 2003, LAS Flight 4246, a Douglas DC-9-15F (registered HK-4246X), crashed near Mitú, killing all 3 occupants on board.

On May 28, 2018, a Boeing 727-200F (registered HK-4637) suffered a hard landing at El Dorado International Airport, causing the nosegear to collapse during touchdown. All 5 crew members were uninjured, and the aircraft was repaired.

On October 20, 2020, the same 727 from before, HK-4637, veered off the runway of Arturo Michelena International Airport during landing. The aircraft's landing gear was damage on due to wet grass. All 3 crew members were uninjured, and the aircraft was repaired again after.

See also
List of airlines of Colombia

References

External links

Official Website

Airlines of Colombia
Airlines established in 1972
Cargo airlines
Colombian companies established in 1972